Infinite Worlds is the debut studio album by Cameroon-born musician Laetitia Tamko, under the stage name Vagabon. Released in February 2017, it would be her last record under the Father/Daughter Records banner, as her self-titled follow-up would be released through Nonesuch Records in 2019.

Recorded alongside co-producer, engineer and mixer Chris Daly, the record would expand beyond the lo-fi of Tamko's 2014 EP 
Persian Garden.

Upon its release, the record was greeted with general positivity from music reviewers, with applause going to the songwriting, Tamko's vocals and the record's overall eclectism. It appeared on several year-end lists for 2017.

Background
2014 saw self-taught multi-instrumentalist and songwriter Laetitia Tamko release a six-song EP titled Persian Garden via Miscreant Records. 
Recorded in both a basement in Brooklyn and in Dobbs Ferry, New York, instrumentation help came from multiple collaborators.

2017 would see Tamko with a new recording location and a new producing partner in Christopher Daly. Infinite Worlds would this time be released with the help of Father/Daughter Records, an independent label that boasted bands like Mutual Benefit and Diet Cig.

Several songs appearing on Garden were dusted off and re-recorded for Worlds; "The Embers" was originally named "Sharks" but shifted from "whispered confession to empowering paean" for the full-length. "Fear & Force" and "Cold Apartment" were also given a new sheen.

Collaborators included Gardens bass guitarist Eva Lawitts, who came back to record on the album. The duty of mastering was handled by Jamal Ruhe, who had lended his technical talents to recordings including experimental rock collective Swans' The Seer (2012).

Composition

Musical style

Musically, the aesthetic of Infinite Worlds has been noted as nestling itself into the universe of indie rock. Pitchfork reviewer Kevin Lozano called the record a "victorious...inimitable take" on the genre.

However, it has also been noted as "varied", "genre-spanning" and "incredibly diverse", with sundry genres woven throughout. Its sounds go "from folk to rock to pop, sometimes during the course of a single track." It has been seen as a "mix of spikey noise pop assaults, stripped ballads and more haunting, anxious tendencies".

Kicking off the record is "The Embers". Its sound has been likened its sound to that of indie rock trio Built to Spill and art punk / indie rock octet Modest Mouse, with its "anthemic steady guitars and booming drums" cited as hallmarks.

"Fear & Force", the second song, contains backing vocals from fellow musician Greta Kline, known for her bedroom pop / indie pop project Frankie Cosmos. A "wistful" acoustic song, it features "lush" synths, "grungy" reverb and "steady" kick drums. It is followed by the "surging" punk-pop of "Minneapolis".  

"Mal a L'aise", the fourth track, is sung completely in vocalist Laetitia Tamko's native French, one of the languages spoken in her birth country of Cameroon. "One of the most interesting tracks" on Infinite Worlds, it digs into "guazy" ambient pop, like that of the Cocteau Twins, as well as sound collage "made of a spectral chorus of voices, processed and multiplied." It is also "almost close to new age," being compared it to the music of Grouper and Harold Budd. While some have seen it as chillwave and dream pop, it has also been credited with "innocuously weaving late 1990s post-rock with left field electronica", yielding a "near instrumental".

The "strangled" post-punk of "100 Years" is followed by "waltzing" indie pop on "Cleaning House". The record ends with the "haunted" indie folk of "Alive and a Well".

Lyrical content

Infinite Worlds dwells on concepts of community, love, personhood, and finding and sharing safe spaces with others. 

Noting that Worlds conceptually thought upon "sharing space with others who don't necessarily see eye to eye", Pitchforks Kevin Lozano summed up a point that the record kept coming back to: "the community you want to live in is one you have to make."

"100 Years" employs magical realism to "paint recollections of a childhood home". It dons a "spirited rebellion", with Tamko singing lines like "if we sell this house / I won't go / no, I won't go!"

Ideas of displacement also appear, reflected on in songs like closer "Alive and a Well" on which Tamko sings "take what you need and go / don't look back and see / if the well is producing."

The record has also drawn comparisons to A Seat at the Table, the lauded third studio album by singer-songwriter and record producer Solange, though that record was rooted in significantly more neo soul and R&B territory musically.

Title and packaging
During her recording process, Tamko read a collection of poetry by Dana Ward called The Crisis of Infinite Worlds, where the recording gets its name. Upon noting the book as challenging to read, Tamko said:

The cover artwork is supplied by Kaela Chambers, who also did the artwork for Garden.

Critical reception

Infinite Worlds was released to positive reviews from multiple music critics. On Metacritic, the record holds a score of 84 out of 100, which indicates "universal acclaim", based on 9 reviews.

Kevin Lozano for Pitchfork gave the record a glowing assessment, applauding it as "never downtrodden" and "a stunning document of what indie rock can look like from a viewpoint that isn't necessarily widespread in the genre." It was awarded the website's "Best New Music" accolade. El Hunt of DIY called the record "a witty, succinct debut album."

 Accolades 

 Semester-end lists 

 Year-end lists 

 Tracks 

Impact and legacy
Infinite Worlds and its maker were touched on in Pitchforks Features Editor Jillian Mapes' essay The Year "Indie Rock" Meant Something Different, released in December 2017. Mapes reflected on how the year saw queer, multi-racial and female musicians at the forefront of indie rock music. She noted Perfume Genius, Jay Som, and Moses Sumney, among others such as Vagabon herself, as "all key players in [the genre's] latest revolution."

About the record, she wrote how "Tamko's shouts about making your own space in the world quietly shook me in a new way." She also noted how the songs "felt necessary" in 2017.

Track listing
All songs written by Laetitia Tamko.

Sample credits
 "Mal á L'aise" samples and remixes elements of an untitled song by Steve Sobs and includes a sample of Eric Littman's voice.

Personnel

Musicians
Credits adapted from the record's Bandcamp page.Vagabon Lætitia Tamko – lead vocals, bass, drums, guitars, synths Additional musicians'
 Casey Weissbuch – drums
 Dominick Anfiteatro – bass
 Elaiza Santos – additional vocals
 Elise Okusami – drums 
 Eric Littman – additional vocals (on "Mal à L'aise")
 Eva Lawitts – bass
 Greta Kline – additional vocals (on "Fear & Force")

Technical

 Laetitia Tamko – producer
 Christopher Daly – engineer, mixer, producer
 Jamal Ruhe – mastering

Artwork and design

 Kaela Chambers - cover artwork

References

2017 debut albums
Father/Daughter Records albums